CPM S30V is a martensitic (hardened) powder-made (sintered) wear and corrosion resistant stainless steel developed by Dick Barber of Crucible Industries in collaboration with knifemaker Chris Reeve.  Its chemistry promotes the formation and even distribution of vanadium carbides, which are harder and more effective at cutting than chromium carbides. These vanadium carbides give the steel a very refined grain, further improving the sharpness and toughness. Despite some difficulties with a consistent heat-treat, knifemakers use CPM S30V because its composition makes it easier to grind than other powder steels although the carbides still wear down the grinder belts considerably. It contains carbon 1.45%, chromium 14.00%, vanadium 4.00%, and molybdenum 2.00%. Barber received feedback from a number of other knife users and knifemakers such as Sal Glesser, Ernest Emerson, Tony Marfione, Phil Wilson, William Harsey Jr., Tom Mayo, Jerry Hossom, and Paul Bos in the development of CPM S30V.

CPM S30V is considered a premium grade knife steel. It is so expensive that it strongly affects the price of the knife, and is largely used in higher-end production and custom knives. Buck Knives calls it "the absolute best blade steel available".   Joe Talmadge claims it might be the ultimate high-end all-around stainless steel, due to high performance coupled with easier machinability and sharpenability than the other steels in this class.

Properties

Composition

Physical properties 

Coefficient of thermal expansion

CPM-S35VN
In 2009, Crucible Steel introduced an update to CPM-S30V to meet the needs of renowned knife maker Chris Reeve that they called CPM-S35VN. The addition of 0.5% Niobium, and reductions in both Carbon from (1.45% to 1.40%) and Vanadium (from 4% to 3%) produced an alloy with 25% increase in measured Charpy V-notch toughness over S30V (Crucible claims 15-20% improvement). Working chefs and outdoor survivalists laud the improved toughness of S35VN, which greatly reduces the micro-bevel chipping that tends to plague S30V in rough use. In these kinds of applications the advantage of an S35VN blade over S30V is quick honing  with a strop or steel stick in lieu of needing to remove metal and reform the edge. In light use, edge-holding and stainless properties between S35VN versus S30V are thought to be roughly the same, and performance will often be affected nearly as much by the applied heat treatment, blade design, and the edge geometry as the differences in metal chemistry.

Around this same time period, Carpenter CTS-XHP and Uddeholm Elmax became more widely available for cutlery usage. These powdered steels use a different process than Crucible, but they are also high-end stainless steels (with high-chromium and high-vanadium levels similar to S30V and S35VN) intended to compete with CPM-S30V and CPM-S35VN.

References 

Ferrous alloys
Stainless steel